The First cabinet of Adolphe Thiers was announced on 22 February 1836 by King Louis Philippe I.
It replaced the Cabinet of Victor de Broglie.  

Adolphe Thiers resigned on 25 August 1836 when the king refused to accept his recommendation to send troops to destroy the revolutionary party in Spain, which was strongly supported by the Minister of War, Nicolas Joseph Maison. On 6 September 1836 the cabinet was replaced by the First cabinet of Louis Mathieu Molé.

Ministers

The cabinet was created by ordinance of 22 February 1836. The ministers were:
 President of the Council: Adolphe Thiers
 Foreign Affairs: Adolphe Thiers
 Interior: Camille de Montalivet
 Justice and Religious Affairs: Paul Jean Pierre Sauzet
 War: Nicolas Joseph Maison
 Finance: Antoine Maurice Apollinaire d'Argout
 Navy and Colonies: Guy-Victor Duperré
 Public Education: Joseph Pelet de la Lozère
 Commerce and Public Works: Hippolyte Passy

References

French governments
1836 establishments in France
1836 disestablishments in France
Cabinets established in 1836
Cabinets disestablished in 1836